Igunga is one of the seven districts of the Tabora Region of Tanzania.  It is bordered to the north by the Shinyanga Region, to the east by the Singida Region, to the south by the Uyui District and to the west by the Nzega District. Its administrative seat is the town of Igunga. Igunga is now divided by two Constituencys: Igunga Constituency and Manonga Constituency, whereby Manonga town is Choma Chankola. Igunga is the second district in production 

According to the 2002 Tanzania National Census, the population of the Igunga District was 325,547. .

According to the 2012 Tanzania National Census, the population of Igunga District was 399,727.

Transport
Paved Trunk road T3 from Morogoro to Rwanda passes through the district from east to west.

Administrative subdivisions
As of 2012, Igunga District was administratively divided into 35 wards.

Wards

 Igunga
 Bukoko
 Mtunguru
 Nanga
 Itumba
 Nguvumoja
 Mbutu
Isakamaliwa
 Igurubi
 Kinungu
 Itunduru
 Kining'inila
 Mwamashiga
Mwamashimba
Mwamakona
 Choma Chankola
 Ngulu
 Ntobo
 Mwashiku
 Ziba
 Ibologero
 Nyandekwa
 Kitangiri
 Ndembezi
 Nkinga
 Ugaka

 Simbo
 Mwisi
 Chabutwa
 Sungwisi
 Kambi ya chupa 
 Mwamala
 Uswaya
 Tambarale
  Igoweko

Sources
 Igunga District Homepage for the 2002 Tanzania National Census

References

Districts of Tabora Region